Win Oo (13 March 1935 – 14 December 1988) was a two-time Myanmar Motion Picture Academy Awards winning Burmese actor, singer, director, writer and publisher. He became publicly known for his acting, singing and directing. Win was considered one of the most important actors in history of Burmese cinema. He died of colorectal cancer in 1988.

Youth
Win Oo was born on 13 March 1935 as Hla Myint in Rangoon (now Yangon) to his parents U Ba Nyunt (Chit-Dukkha), a history professor at Rangoon University, and Daw Hnin Yi, as the third of five children. He matriculated at TTC (Practicing High School, passing his 10th standard examinations at the age of 14. He subsequently attended Rangoon University, where he studied mathematics, economics, and French and wrote short stories under the pen name "Nyo Min Lwin." 

In 1952, during his third year, he departed from his university studies and joined the Burmese Army. Win Oo was stationed in Maymyo (now Pyin Oo Lwin) and Meiktila, and spent 9 months in 1959 training in Australia. Upon his return to Burma, he became a more prolific writer, penning nineteen stories in Shumuwa, including a novel, A University Student (တက္ကသိုလ်ကျောင်းသားတစ်ဦး), in 1960. He was honourably discharged from the army as a captain in 1962.

Career
He launched his acting career in 1962, starring in Hna-Yauk Hte Nay-Gyin-De, adapted from his eponymous novel, directed by Tin Yu. But this movie was not his first film. Chit-Thaw-Thu-Ta-Yout was his first film in cinema but this movie was not commercially successful. He both directed and starred in Saung Einmet and Hmon Shwe Yee. He founded the Sanda movie company, established first "color offset printer" in Burma, established "Sanda Magazine Office" and published Sanda Magazine. He won numerous Myanmar Academy Award for his performances, including Best Actor for Hmon Shwe Yee in 1970. He starred in 27 films, before passing away in 1988. He wrote 31 novels. His most famous book is Main ma Hla Ah Mone.

Legacy
He is best known for his image, acting, unusual voice, and way of speaking and singing, which some artists often imitate as a fun way of entertainment, especially in traditional live performances on the stage. The BBC (Myanmar) described that in Myanmar, not many artists have great success beyond their age and grave, and that Win Oo is one of the few whose success and influence extend till these days. The late Hla Htut, a famous Myanmar pianist and composer,  remarked that his use of low-pitched, nasal and legato voices in several songs like "Maung Do Cherry Myay" (Our Cherry Land) and his voices of interjection in such songs as "Mee Pon Pwe" (Bonfire) and "Ma Ma Moe" (Lady Moe) were quite distinct and earned his place in the category of remake-western songs in Myanmar. He directed and appeared as an actor in many films; in Ah Twe Ah Tar, an unusual film for that time because no actress appeared; the main roles are a child-actress and him only, and in a self-directed film, Chit Thu Yway Mae` Chit Ware Le` he acted in an octa-role with many actresses, which he even made it successful in spite of lack of high film-technology for that period. Hmon Shwe Yi is one of his prominent works, through which some elements and aspects of Myanmar Stage Performance and Entertainment can be observed. Last but not least, his love for songs by Myoma Nyein and participation in Mandalay Thingyan festival over a decade is still considered to be a cultural icon in Myanmar.

Filmography

Awards

References

Cartoon Win Aung's famous artist published in 2006.

External links
Win Oo' Songs
Myanmar chronicle

Burmese male film actors
Burmese film directors
Burmese screenwriters
Burmese cinematographers
People from Yangon
1935 births
1988 deaths
20th-century Burmese male actors
20th-century screenwriters